American Airlines Flight 625, a Boeing 727-100, crashed at St. Thomas, U.S. Virgin Islands on April 27, 1976, while on a domestic scheduled passenger flight originating at T. F. Green Airport in Rhode Island and ending at Saint Thomas, United States Virgin Islands, with an intermediate stop at John F. Kennedy International Airport. 37 out of the 88 passengers on board died in the accident.

Accident

The American Airlines Boeing 727-23, registration  overran the departure end of Runway 9 when landing at Harry S. Truman airport.  The aircraft struck an Instrument Landing System antenna, crashed through a chain link fence, and traveled another  until stopped by a gas station. The aircraft was destroyed.

The airport in St. Thomas was notorious among pilots for its short runway.  In fact, the Boeing 727 was the heaviest aircraft type authorized to use it, and even then it was only authorized in one direction.

Ultimately, the NTSB attributed the crash to pilot error on the approach. The maximum flap setting of 40 degrees was never applied, which meant that the aircraft's speed was  higher than VREF as it crossed the runway threshold.  This, combined with the fact that the aircraft 'floated' from turbulent winds in the area, meant that it was already  down the runway at the point of touchdown.  The pilots did not brake, and proceeded to apply full throttle three seconds after touchdown in an attempt at a go-around. However, they were unable to reach takeoff speed because the 727's engines are slow-responding, taking about 6.6 seconds to power up.  After five seconds of waiting for power, and with only  of runway left, the pilot panicked, according to the report, and applied full brakes.  Further, the pilot forgot to apply reverse engine thrust until immediately before impact.

Ultimately, the aircraft ran off the end of the runway and into a Shell gas station, killing 37 (35 passengers and 2 flight attendants) of the 88 on board. Thirty-eight other passengers and crew were injured, and one person on the ground was seriously injured. The probable cause was the captain's actions and his judgment in not being aware that when he touched down  down the  runway, he did not have enough distance to perform a go-around.

As a result of the crash, American Airlines ended all jet flights to St. Thomas, flying instead to St. Croix (which had a 7,600 foot runway at the time). American Airlines passengers were then flown to St. Thomas in Convair 440 propeller-driven aircraft from St. Croix, with these flights being operated by a wholly owned subsidiary, American Inter-Island Airlines. The Convair 440 aircraft were owned by American Airlines and flown and maintained via contract by Antilles Air Boats, a seaplane operator in the U.S. Virgin Islands.

In popular culture 
American Airlines Flight 625 was specifically mentioned in the movie Rain Man.

See also
 Aviation safety
 List of accidents and incidents involving commercial aircraft

Notes

References

 United Kingdom Civil Aviation Authority, CAP479 World Airline Accident Summary Volume 2,

External links 
 
NTSB Accident Investigation Report (PDF file)

Airliner accidents and incidents caused by pilot error
Airliner accidents and incidents involving runway overruns
Aviation accidents and incidents in the United States in 1976
Accidents and incidents involving the Boeing 727
625
Airliner accidents and incidents in the United States Virgin Islands
1976 in the United States Virgin Islands
April 1976 events in the United States